Sarah Holcomb is an American former actress. Her first role was in National Lampoon's Animal House (1978) as Clorette DePasto, the 13-year-old daughter of shady Mayor Carmine DePasto; Holcomb was age 19 when filming began in October, 1977. 

Following Animal House, she had roles in four other films, including Caddyshack, released in 1980. She was cast in Jaws 2 (1978), but was one of several teenage actors let go as that film went through many script revisions early in production.

Animal House co-writer Chris Miller said "She was young, younger than the rest of us. We were a fast crowd. Drugs were everywhere. She fell into what, for lack of a better term, you would have to call bad company."

The character Dorri Lawrence in the film Stateside, an actress who suffers from schizophrenia, is based on Holcomb.

Filmography

References

External links
 

American film actresses
Living people
Actresses from Connecticut
21st-century American women
Year of birth missing (living people)